The Mowing-Devil: or, Strange News out of Hartford-shire is the title of an English woodcut pamphlet published in 1678. The pamphlet tells of a farmer in Hertfordshire who, refusing to pay the price demanded by a labourer to mow his field, swore he would rather the Devil mowed it instead.

According to the pamphlet, that night his field appeared to be in flame. The next morning, the field was found to be perfectly mowed, "that no mortal man was able to do the like".

This pamphlet, and the accompanying illustration, are often cited by crop circle researchers as among the first recorded cases of crop circles. Crop circle researcher Jim Schnabel does not consider it to be a historical precedent because it describes the stalks as being cut, while modern crop circles involve the wheat, barley or, less commonly, other plants being bent.

Transcription

See also
 Crop circle

References

External links
 Swirled News article

Pamphlets
1678 books
Alleged UFO-related entities
Supernatural legends
Agriculture in Hertfordshire